Sead Bučan (born 8 March 1981) is a Bosnian retired professional footballer who played as a midfielder.

Honours

Player
Sarajevo
Bosnian Premier League: 2006–07

Željezničar
Bosnian Premier League: 2009–10

References

External links
Sead Bučan at Sofascore

1983 births
Living people
Footballers from Sarajevo
Association football midfielders
Bosnia and Herzegovina footballers
FK Olimpik players 
Guangzhou City F.C. players
FK Sarajevo players
FK Željezničar Sarajevo players
RNK Split players
FK Borac Banja Luka players
NK Čelik Zenica players
Premier League of Bosnia and Herzegovina players
First League of the Federation of Bosnia and Herzegovina players
Chinese Super League players
Croatian Football League players
Bosnia and Herzegovina expatriate footballers
Expatriate footballers in China
Bosnia and Herzegovina expatriate sportspeople in China
Expatriate footballers in Croatia
Bosnia and Herzegovina expatriate sportspeople in Croatia